The Asian Badminton Championships 1985  took place from 15 to 21 April in Kuala Lumpur, Malaysia. Both individual competitions (except Mixed doubles) and men's team competition were conducted. At the end of day, China took titles from three disciplines, Men's singles, Women's singles and Men's team competitions while South Korea won Men's doubles and Women's doubles events.

Medalists

Men's singles

Women's singles

Men's doubles

Women's doubles

Men's team results

Semifinals 
China V/s Indonesia

Malaysia V/s South Korea

Bronze medal tie 
Indonesia V/s South Korea

Final 
China V/s Malaysia

References 

Badminton Asia Championships
Asian Badminton Championships
1985 Badminton Asia Championships
Badminton Asia Championships
Badminton Asia Championships